Lani O'Grady (born Lanita Rose Agrati, October 2, 1954 – September 25, 2001) was an American actress and talent agent. She is best remembered for her role as Mary Bradford, the eldest sister from Eight Is Enough.

Early life
O'Grady was born Lanita Rose Agrati in Walnut Creek, California, to Lou A. Agrati and to Mary B. Grady (née Castellino), a children's talent agent. She was the sister of actor/musician Don Grady. Even as a youngster, she had a low-pitched voice.

Career
O'Grady began acting at age 13 with a role in the television series The High Chaparral. In the early 1970s, she appeared on Harry O and had a role in the 1975 television movie Cage Without a Key, starring Susan Dey. In 1976, she co-starred in the feature film Massacre at Central High along with Kimberly Beck (who appeared as Nancy in the Eight Is Enough pilot).

The following year, O'Grady landed the role of Mary Bradford in the ABC series Eight Is Enough and changed her name to O'Grady. She appeared in 112 episodes of the series. She also reprised the role of Mary Bradford in two Eight Is Enough reunion television movies in 1987 and 1989.

After the series ended in 1981, O'Grady had a role in the 1982 television movie The Kid with the Broken Halo starring Gary Coleman. Her last acting role was as Mrs. Kramer in the soap opera Days of Our Lives in 1990.

Personal life and death
After suffering from agoraphobia and memory blackouts in the early 1990s, O'Grady retired from acting and became a talent agent. She also began taking nonnarcotic medication for a diagnosed brain chemical imbalance. In a 1994 interview with the Los Angeles Times, O'Grady said she had suffered from panic attacks since the age of 18 but was not diagnosed with panic disorder until she was 21. She also admitted that she abused prescription drugs and alcohol, including Valium.

In December 1998, she entered the Thalians Mental Health Department at Cedars-Sinai Medical Center for detoxification.

O'Grady died in her mobile home in Valencia, Santa Clarita, California at age 46 on September 25, 2001. An autopsy revealed toxic levels of the painkiller Vicodin and antidepressant Prozac in her bloodstream, and the Los Angeles County Coroner's office said she died of "multiple-drug intoxication", although the coroner was unable to determine if her death was an accident or suicide.

Filmography

References

External links

1954 births
2001 deaths
20th-century American actresses
Actresses from California
American child actresses
American film actresses
American television actresses
Drug-related deaths in California
People from Walnut Creek, California
People from Valencia, Santa Clarita, California